Jennifer Vreugdenhil (born 12 January 1995) is a Dutch former professional footballer who played as a goalkeeper.

Vreugdenhil played for ADO Den Haag and Valencia at club level and was capped by the Netherlands national team. She retired from professional football in August 2020 at the age of 25.

International career
Vreugdenhil made her senior team debut for Netherlands on 2 March 2018 in a 3–2 win against Denmark.

Career statistics

International

Honours
ADO Den Haag
 Eredivisie: 2011–12
 KNVB Women's Cup: 2011–12, 2012–13 and 2015–16

Netherlands U19
UEFA Women's Under-19 Championship: 2014

Netherlands
Algarve Cup: 2018

References

External links
Senior national team profile at Onsoranje.nl (in Dutch)
Under-23 national team profile at Onsoranje.nl (in Dutch)
Under-19 national team profile at Onsoranje.nl (in Dutch)
Under-17 national team profile at Onsoranje.nl (in Dutch)
Under-16 national team profile at Onsoranje.nl (in Dutch)
Under-15 national team profile at Onsoranje.nl (in Dutch)

1995 births
Living people
People from Oosterhout
Dutch women's footballers
Women's association football goalkeepers
Eredivisie (women) players
BeNe League players
ADO Den Haag (women) players
Primera División (women) players
Valencia CF Femenino players
Netherlands women's international footballers
Footballers from North Brabant
Dutch expatriate sportspeople in Spain
Expatriate women's footballers in Spain
Dutch expatriate women's footballers